Frank Arnesen (born 30 September 1956) is a former Danish footballer and sporting director at Dutch football club Feyenoord. Arnesen was the Director of Football at English football clubs Tottenham Hotspur and Chelsea, and was Sporting Director at Hamburger SV, Metalist Kharkiv and PAOK FC.

As a player, he most notably played with Dutch clubs Ajax and PSV Eindhoven, winning the 1988 European Cup with PSV. Arnesen was capped 52 times and scored 14 goals for the Danish national team, and participated in the Euro 1984 and 1986 FIFA World Cup tournaments.

Playing career
Arnesen moved from his childhood club Fremad Amager, in the lower leagues of Danish football, to the big Dutch team Ajax in November/December 1975. At the time he was only 18, and made the move together with Fremad Amager and teammate Søren Lerby, who was only 17. Arnesen got his debut with Ajax 3 or 4 months later, on 7 March 1976, in a 1–1 draw with FC Utrecht. It was also in his time at Ajax, that Arnesen debuted for the Danish national team, in a 1977 friendly 1–0 loss against Sweden, in Malmö. In Arnesen's six seasons at Ajax, he won three Dutch Eredivisie championship titles in 1977, 1979, and 1980, and won the KNVB Cup in 1979, beating FC Twente 3–0 in the final. In 1978, 1980 and 1981, Ajax also reached the KNVB Cup finals, but lost. In 1980, Arnesen and Ajax reached the semi-final of the European Cup, before they were eliminated by English team Nottingham Forest, the European Cup winners in the 1978-1979 and 1979–1980 seasons (2–0 away loss, 1–0 home win, 31 goals for and 8 goals against in the 1979-80 tournament).

In the summer of 1981, Arnesen was bought by the Spanish football club Valencia CF, and two years later he went to Belgium to play for RSC Anderlecht. In November 1985, Arnesen returned to the Netherlands to play for Ajax' rivals PSV Eindhoven. Here he saw three extremely successful seasons, winning the Eredivisie three years in a row, in 1986, 1987, and 1988, with fellow Danes Jan Heintze, Søren Lerby and Ivan Nielsen. Arnesen stopped his international career in 1987, after the Danish team qualified for the Euro 1988. In 1988, he won the KNVB Cup once more, and he was part of the PSV team that conquered the European Cup, though he did not play in the final match due to an injury.

Management career
After his active career, Arnesen was first appointed assistant coach at PSV under Bobby Robson from 1991 to 1993, and in 1994 he became the club's general manager. Arnesen spent 10 years as director of football at PSV Eindhoven, and was credited with discovering major talents, such as Brazilian striker Ronaldo and Dutch players Jaap Stam, Ruud van Nistelrooy, and Arjen Robben. In May 2004, Arnesen was brought to Tottenham Hotspur, replacing David Pleat. Arnesen was to function as the manager responsible for player transfers and scouting for new talent, while coach Jacques Santini handled the daily training sessions and match setups; an arrangement identical to Arnesen's days as PSV manager. Things didn't work out well, and Santini left within months citing "personal problems" as his reason for leaving. Arnesen's original hiring for assistant coach, Martin Jol, was put in charge of the club.

Arnesen was suspended by Spurs on 4 June 2005 for expressing a desire to move to rival club Chelsea, after Chelsea allegedly made an illegal approach to sign him as manager. Arnesen was photographed aboard one of Roman Abramovich's three luxury yachts on 22 June 2005 thus reinforcing Tottenham's compensation claim. Arnesen was recommended to Abramovich by Piet de Visser. Later on one of the reasons to end José Mourinho's contract would have been that Mourinho did not want to engage with Abramovich's football consultants. On 24 June, both clubs announced that they had reached a financial settlement, later disclosed to be £5 million but widely reported to be closer to £8 million, and Arnesen would move to Chelsea, filling in the role of head talent scout, in charge of uncovering footballing talents. Arnesen has since played a key role in bringing Salomon Kalou, Florent Malouda and Mikel John Obi to Chelsea. But the club has still pursued expensive purchases of established international players rather than unearthing and developing young talent as hoped. On 27 November 2010 Chelsea announced that Arnesen had resigned as sporting director and would be leaving the club at the end of the 2010–11 season. On 20 February he decided to join Hamburger SV for the foreseeable future as sporting director, instead of returning to Ajax Amsterdam.

As a Hamburg SV Sporting Director, Arnesen took Chelsea youngsters to Hamburg like Jacopo Sala, Michael Mancienne, Gökhan Töre, Slobodan Rajković (all permanent) and Jeffrey Bruma (on loan).
On 10 October 2011 Arnesen took over the additional task of the head coach of Hamburger SV for just one match before hiring and installing a permanent new coach with Thorsten Fink.

On 22 May 2013 Hamburg SV confirmed that Arnesen had agreed to depart from his role as Sporting Director at the club. Arnesen was with the club for two years including a spell as interim manager.

On 30 January 2014 FC Metalist Kharkiv announced that Arnesen will take over the role as Sporting Director from 1 February 2014. This position was only held for a month as Arnesen and FC metalist agreed that Arnesen could leave the club due to the ongoing violent political situation in Ukraine.

Speaking on the official FC Metalist Kharkiv website Arnesen said:

"I want to thank everyone in "Metalist". I got acquainted with all staff during this short period and realized that true professionals and very nice people work in the club. Also I would like to apologize to the fans, but the circumstances were stronger than me. The situation in Ukraine forced me to make this choice. I want to wish everyone at "Metalist" and throughout the Ukraine all the best in these difficult times". 

On 27 May 2015 PAOK FC announced that Arnesen will be the new Sporting Director of the club for the next three years. After 9 months it was announced that his contract was terminated.

Honours

Ajax
 Eredivisie: 1976–77, 1978–79, 1979–80
 KNVB Cup: 1978–79

RSC Anderlecht

 Belgian First Division A: 1984–85
 UEFA Cup: 1983–84 (runners-up)
 Jules Pappaert Cup: 1983, 1985

PSV
 Eredivisie: 1985–86, 1986–87, 1987–88
 KNVB Cup: 1987–88
 European Cup: 1987–88

Individual
 UEFA Euro Team of the Tournament: 1984
 Danish Football Hall of Fame: Inductee

References

External links
 Denmark national team profile

1956 births
Living people
Footballers from Copenhagen
Danish men's footballers
AFC Ajax players
Valencia CF players
R.S.C. Anderlecht players
PSV Eindhoven players
Eredivisie players
La Liga players
Belgian Pro League players
Denmark international footballers
Denmark under-21 international footballers
Denmark youth international footballers
UEFA Euro 1984 players
1986 FIFA World Cup players
Tottenham Hotspur F.C. non-playing staff
Chelsea F.C. non-playing staff
Danish expatriate men's footballers
Danish expatriate sportspeople in the Netherlands
Expatriate footballers in the Netherlands
Danish expatriate sportspeople in Spain
Expatriate footballers in Spain
Danish expatriate sportspeople in Belgium
Expatriate footballers in Belgium
Danish expatriate sportspeople in England
Hamburger SV managers
Danish football managers
Danish expatriate football managers
PAOK FC non-playing staff
Association football midfielders
Fremad Amager players